The uMlalazi Local Municipality council consists of fifty-five members elected by mixed-member proportional representation. Twenty-eight councillors are elected by first-past-the-post voting in twenty-eight wards, while the remaining twenty-seven are chosen from party lists so that the total number of party representatives is proportional to the number of votes received. In the election of 1 November 2021 the Inkatha Freedom Party (IFP) won a majority of thirty seats on the council.

Results 
The following table shows the composition of the council after past elections.

December 2000 election

The following table shows the results of the 2000 election.

March 2006 election

The following table shows the results of the 2006 election.

May 2011 election

The following table shows the results of the 2011 election.

August 2016 election

The following table shows the results of the 2016 election.

By-elections from August 2016 to November 2021 

In a by-election held on 29 November 2017, a ward previously held by an ANC councillor was won by the IFP candidate. Council composition was reconfigured as seen below:

November 2021 election

The following table shows the results of the 2021 election.

References

uMlalazi
Elections in KwaZulu-Natal